The Nueces roundnose minnow (Dionda serena) is a species of ray-finned fish in the family Cyprinidae.
It is endemic to the upper Nueces in Texas.

References

Dionda
Freshwater fish of the United States
Fish described in 1856
Taxa named by Charles Frédéric Girard